Cheirocerus abuelo, is a species of demersal catfish of the family Pimelodidae that is native to Lago Maracaibo basin of northwestern Venezuela.

It grows to a length of 20.0 cm. It inhabits fresh water rivers in Río de los Pajaros, río Agua Caliente, río Negro, río Apón, río Socuy and Lago Maracaibo.

It is clearly distinguished from other species with 30-33 gill rakers. It feeds primarily on benthic invertebrates.

References

Pimelodidae
Catfish of South America
Freshwater fish of Venezuela
Fish described in 1944